Vincent Michael Carter (November 6, 1891 – December 30, 1972) was a United States representative from Wyoming.

Born in St. Clair, Pennsylvania, he moved with his parents to Pottsville in 1893. He attended public schools, the United States Naval Academy Preparatory School, and Fordham University. He graduated in 1915 from Catholic University's Columbus School of Law in Washington, D.C.

During World War I he served in the United States Marine Corps as a lieutenant in the Eighth Regiment, Third Brigade, and was a captain in the Wyoming Army National Guard from 1919 to 1921.

Carter was admitted to the bar in 1919, and commenced practice in Casper, Wyoming. He moved to Kemmerer, Wyoming in 1929 and continued the practice of law, serving as deputy attorney general of Wyoming from 1919 to 1923. In 1922, Carter was elected Wyoming State Auditor, and he was re-elected in 1926.

Carter was elected as a Republican to the Seventy-first and to the two succeeding Congresses, serving from March 4, 1929 to January 3, 1935; he was not a candidate for renomination in 1934, but was an unsuccessful candidate for election to the U.S. Senate. He resumed the practice of law in Cheyenne, retiring in 1965; he was a delegate to the Republican National Conventions in 1936 and 1940.

Carter died in Albuquerque, New Mexico; interment was in Albuquerque's Mt. Calvary Cemetery.

References
 Retrieved on 2008-04-02

See also

 

1891 births
1972 deaths
People from St. Clair, Pennsylvania
Republican Party members of the United States House of Representatives from Wyoming
State Auditors of Wyoming
People from Kemmerer, Wyoming
20th-century American politicians
Fordham University alumni
Columbus School of Law alumni
United States Marine Corps officers
Military personnel from Pennsylvania
United States Marine Corps personnel of World War I